Lwemiyaga is a settlement in the Central Region of Uganda. The town is the site of the county headquarters.

Location
The coordinates of the town are 00°04'54.0"N, 31°05'53.0"E (Latitude:0.081667; Longitude:31.098056).

Overview
Lwemiyaga Town, the headquarters of Lwemiyaga County, and Lwemiyaga sub-county, has in the past, been the venue of contentious political battles involving local and national politicians.

Points of interest
The following additional points of interest are located in the town of Lwemiyaga or near its borders:

 offices of Lwemiyaga Town Council
 offices of Lwemiyaga County
 offices of Lwemiyaga sub-county

See also
List of cities and towns in Uganda
Ntuusi

References

External links

Populated places in Central Region, Uganda
Cities in the Great Rift Valley
Sembabule District